Nicolas-Marie d'Alayrac (bapt. 13 June 175326 November 1809), nicknamed the Musician poet, more commonly Nicolas Dalayrac, was a French composer of the Classical period. Intended for a military career, he made the acquaintance of many musicians in the Parisian salons, which convinced him of his true vocation.

Among his most popular works, Nina, or The Woman Crazed with Love (1786), which tackles the theme of madness and arouses real enthusiasm during its creation, premiered on 23 November at the Stroganov Palace. The Two Little Savoyards (1789), which deals with the rapprochement of social classes, a theme bearing the ideals of the French Revolution, Camille ou le Souterrain (1791), judged as his best production or even Léon ou le Château de Monténéro (1798) who by his leitmotifs announces a new genre. If he forges an international reputation, he remains nevertheless less known in the lyrical field than André Grétry.

His first compositions were violin duos, string trios and quartets. He published them under a pseudonym with Italian consonance. The quartets were very successful, and the true identity of their author was eventually discovered. According to René-Charles Guilbert de Pixérécourt, he was initiated into Freemasonry and was a member of the Masonic lodge of «The Nine Sisters». In 1778 he composed the music for the reception of Voltaire, and of the party in honor of Benjamin Franklin at the home of Anne-Catherine de Ligniville Helvétius. Dalayrac actively participated in the development of copyright.

Biography

Childhood and youth 

Nicolas-Marie d'Alayrac was born in Muret on 8 April 1753, into a noble family of Sir Jean d'Alayrac, adviser to the king in the election of Comminges and his wife Marie Cluzel. Baptized five days later, Nicolas Alayrac is the oldest of five children. He was the first of four children, including two sisters who died at a young age, he was sent to the bar, and went to study in Toulouse.

Although trained as a lawyer, he was encouraged by his father to abandon his career and follow his passion for music. He married the actress Gilberte Pétronille Sallarde. After the French Revolution he changed his name from the aristocratic d'Alayrac to Dalayrac. In 1804, he received the Légion d'honneur. He died in Paris, aged 56.

Opéras-comiques

1780–1789

 Le chevalier à la mode (1781)
 Le petit souper (1781)
 L'éclipse totale (1782)
 L'amant statue (1785)
 La dot (1785)
 Nina, ou La folle par amour (1786)
 Azémia (2 parties, 1786)
 Renaud d'Ast (1787)
 Sargines (1788)
 Fanchette (1788)
 Les deux petits Savoyards (1789), libretto by Benoît-Joseph Marsollier des Vivetières, first performance by Les Comédiens ordinaires du Roi, 14 January 1789.
 Raoul, sire de Créqui (1789)

1790–1799

 La soirée orageuse (1790)
 Le chêne patriotique (1790)
 Vert-Vert (1790)
 Camille ou Le souterrain (1791)
 Agnès et Olivier (1791)
 Philippe et Georgette (1791)
 Tout pour l'amour (1792)
 Ambroise (1793)
 Asgill (2 parties, 1793)
 La prise de Toulon (1794)
 Le congrès des rois (1794)
 L'enfance de Jean-Jacques Rousseau (1794)
 Les détenus (1794)
 Adèle et Dorsan (1795)
 Marianne (1796)
 La maison isolée (1797)
 La leçon (1797)
 Gulnare (1797)
 Alexis (1798)
 Léon (1798)
 Primerose (1798)
 Adolphe et Clara, ou Les deux prisonniers (1799)

1800–1809

 Aire de Maison à vendre (1800)
 Léhéman (1801)
 L'antichambre (1802)
 La boucle de cheveux (1803)
 La jeune prude (1804)
 Une heure de mariage (1804)
 Le Pavillon du Calife, ou Almanzor et Zobéïde, opera in two acts and in free verse, in collaboration with Jean-Baptiste-Denis Despré and Étienne Morel de Chédeville (1805)
 Le pavillon des fleurs (1805)
 Gulistan ou Le hulla de Samarcande (1805)
 Deux mots (1806)
 Koulouf ou Les chinois (1806)
 Lina (1807)
 Élise-Hortense (1808)
 Les trois sultanes (1809)
 Le poète et le musicien (1809, op. post., f.p. 1811)

References

Notes 

Citations

Sources

 
 
 .

See also
Les Neuf Sœurs

External links

 Azémia, ou Les Sauvages, opéra comique, 3 acts, by Nicolas-Marie Dalayrac, digitized by BYU on archive.org
 List of Works
 

1753 births
1809 deaths
French male classical composers
French opera composers
Male opera composers
People from Muret
Chevaliers of the Légion d'honneur
French Freemasons